A Murder of Crows is the second full-length studio album by the progressive metal band Deadsoul Tribe, released on 28 July 2003 by InsideOut Music. This time the entire band has come to play for the album with the addition of Roland Kerschbaumer for rhythm guitar and replaced  Volker Wilschko to guitar. The song, "Time" is the bonus track for the limited edition which comes in a slipcase.

Track listing 
 "Feed (Part 1 – Stone by Stone)" − 5:04
 "Feed (Part 2 – The Awakening)" − 2:53
 "The Messenger" − 5:15
 "In a Garden Made of Stones" − 6:26
 "Some Things You Can't Return" − 5:20
 "Angels in Vertigo" − 4:38
 "Regret" − 4:36
 "Crows on the Wire" − 6:48
 "I'm Not Waving" − 5:34
 "Flies" − 5:12
 "Black Smoke and Mirrors" − 4:58
 "Time" (Bonus Track) − 4:28

Credits 
 Devon Graves − guitar, lead vocals, bass, flute, keyboard
 Roland Ivenz − bass
 Adel Moustafa − drums
 Roland Kerschbaumer − rhythm guitar
 lorenna faucher − guitar

References

Deadsoul Tribe albums
2003 albums
Inside Out Music albums
Albums with cover art by Travis Smith (artist)